Domenico Ravenna (1584 – 1637) was a Roman Catholic prelate who served as Bishop of Nicastro (1635–1637).

Biography
Domenico Ravenna was born in Rome in 1584 and ordained a priest in November 1634.
On 12 February 1635, he was appointed during the papacy of Pope Urban VIII as Bishop of Nicastro.
On 18 February 1635, he was consecrated bishop by Francesco Maria Brancaccio, Cardinal-Priest of Santi XII Apostoli, with Carlo Carafa, Bishop of Aversa, and Pier Luigi Carafa, Bishop of Tricarico, with serving as co-consecrators. 
He served as Bishop of Nicastro until his death in July 1637. 
While bishop, he was the principal co-consecrator of Orazio Muscettola, Bishop of Trevico (1636); and Maurizio Ragano, Bishop of Fondi (1636).

References

External links and additional sources
 (for Chronology of Bishops) 
 (for Chronology of Bishops)  

17th-century Italian Roman Catholic bishops
Bishops appointed by Pope Urban VIII
1584 births
1637 deaths